Baryplegma ricavelatum is a species of tephritid or fruit flies in the genus Baryplegma of the family Tephritidae.

Distribution
Baryplegma ricavelatum live in Peru.

References

Tephritinae
Insects described in 1914
Diptera of South America